An Association for Joint Cultivation of Land, TOZ, was a form of Agricultural cooperative in early Soviet Union (1918–1938). In a TOZ, only land and labor were common.

See also
Kolkhoz
Sovkhoz

Agricultural organizations based in the Soviet Union